The 2006 Qatar Ladies Open (known as the 2006 Qatar Total Open for sponsorship reasons), was a tennis tournament played on outdoor hard courts. It was the 6th edition of the Qatar Total Open, and was part of the Tier II Series of the 2006 WTA Tour. It took place at the Khalifa International Tennis Complex in Doha, Qatar, from February 27 through March 5, 2007.

Points and prize money

Point distribution

Prize money

1 Points per the WTA.
2 Qualifiers prize money is also the Round of 32 prize money
* per team

Singles main-draw entrants

Seeds

 Rankings are as of February 20, 2006.

Other entrants
The following players received wildcards into the singles main draw:
  Martina Hingis
  Selima Sfar

The following players received entry from the qualifying draw:
  Li Ting
  Eleni Daniilidou
  Shikha Uberoi
  Neha Uberoi

Doubles main-draw entrants

Seeds

 Rankings are as of February 20, 2006.

Other entrants
The following pair received wildcards into the doubles main draw:
  Antonia Matic /  Tatiana Poutchek

The following pair received entry from the qualifying draw:
  Angelika Bachmann /  Kira Nagy

Withdrawals
During the tournament
  Květa Peschke /  Francesca Schiavone

Finals

Singles

 Nadia Petrova defeated  Amélie Mauresmo, 6–3, 7–5
 It was the 2nd singles title for Petrova in her career.

Doubles

 Daniela Hantuchová /  Ai Sugiyama defeated  Li Ting /  Sun Tiantian, 6–4, 6–4
 It was the 7th title for Hantuchová and the 32nd title for Sugiyama in their respective doubles careers.

External links
 Official Results Archive (ITF)
 Official Results Archive (WTA)

Qatar Ladies Open
Qatar Ladies Open
2006 in Qatari sport